Félix Pierre Jousseaume (12 April 1835, in Charente-Maritime – 3 November 1921) was a French zoologist and malacologist. He studied medicine in Paris where he then practised. His thesis was Des Végétaux parasites de l'Homme. He participated in the founding of the Société zoologique de France and was President of that society in 1878.

After 1890 he abandoned his practice to study malacology. He made many trips to the Red Sea, giving his collections to the Muséum national d'histoire naturelle.

Jousseaume  wrote many short scientific papers mainly published in Naturaliste, revue illustrée des sciences naturelles, les Nouvelles archives des missions scientifiques et littéraires, la Revue et magasin de zoologie, and le Bulletin de la Société zoologique de France. He also wrote in 1899 La Philosophie aux prises avec la Mer Rouge, le darwinisme et les 3 règnes des corps organisés (A. Maloine, Paris : xii + 559 p.), in 1907 De l'Attraction et autres joyeusetés de la science (A. Maloine, Paris : 160 p.) and in 1914 Impressions de voyage en Apharras [Texte imprimé], anthropologie, philosophie, morale d'un peuple errant berger et guerrier (J.-B. Baillière et fils, Paris, deux volumes : xviii + 700 et 575 p.).

See also
 :Category:Taxa named by Félix Pierre Jousseaume

Taxa 
Taxa named in his honor include two genera and several species:
Jousseaumea Sacco, 1894
Jousseaumiella Bourne, 1907
Metis jusseaumei (Richard)
Amphibetaeus jousseaumei Coutière, 1896
Neocallichirus jousseaumei (Nobili, 1904)
Murex jousseaumei Poirier, 1883
Chlamys jousseaumei Bavay, 1904
Cerithiopsis jousseaumei Jay & Drivas, 2002
Clathrosansonia jousseaumei (Bavai, 1921)

Works
Coquilles de la famille des marginelles (1875)

References

French malacologists
Conchologists
1835 births
1921 deaths
French taxonomists
French zoologists
19th-century French zoologists
20th-century French zoologists